David Herd or Hurd may refer to:

 David Herd (anthologist) (1732–1810), Scottish anthologist
 David Herd (footballer) (1934–2016), Scottish footballer
David Hurd (born 1950), composer
David N. Hurd (born 1937), U.S. judge